The Priest's Hat (Italian: Il cappello da prete) is a 1944 Italian historical thriller drama film directed by Ferdinando Maria Poggioli and starring Roldano Lupi, Lída Baarová and Luigi Almirante. It is based on the 1888 novel of the same title by Emilio De Marchi.

It was shot at Cinecittà Studios with sets designed by the art director Gastone Simonetti. It was shot in the summer of 1943, but its release was delayed to ongoing war events and it only premiered in Rome after the city's liberation by the Allies. It belongs to the movies of the calligrafismo style.

Cast

References

Bibliography 
 Peter Bondanella & Federico Pacchioni. A History of Italian Cinema. Bloomsbury Publishing, 2017.

External links 
 

1944 films
1940s historical drama films
Italian historical drama films
1940s Italian-language films
Films directed by Ferdinando Maria Poggioli
Italian black-and-white films
Films shot at Cinecittà Studios
Films set in the 1880s
Films set in Naples
1944 drama films
Films scored by Enzo Masetti
1940s Italian films